Margaret Wilson (born 1947) is a New Zealand politician.

Margaret Wilson may also refer to:
Margaret Wilson (Scottish martyr) (1667–1685), one of the Solway Martyrs
Margaret Bayne Wilson (1795-1835), Scottish missionary to India
Margaret Oliphant Wilson (1828–1897), birth name of Scottish novelist and historical writer Margaret Oliphant
Margaret Wilson (novelist) (1882–1973), American novelist
Margaret Woodrow Wilson (1886–1944), First Lady of the United States, daughter of U.S. President Woodrow Wilson
Margaret Wilson (tennis) (fl.1930s), Australian former tennis player
Margaret Bush Wilson (1919–2009), American activist
Margaret Dauler Wilson (1939–1998), American philosopher and professor of philosophy
Margaret Wilson (cricketer) (born 1946), Australian cricket player 
Margaret Wilson (judge) (born 1953), justice of the Supreme Court of Queensland
Margaret Nales Wilson (born 1989), British-Filipino model, actress and beauty queen
Margaret Wilson (Australian writer), Australian television writer
Margaret Barclay Wilson (1863–1945), professor of physiology
Margaret Wilson (EastEnders), fictional character in the BBC soap opera EastEnders